Pierre Bieliavsky (born 1970 in Brussels, Belgium), is a Belgian mathematician.

Biography 
Pierre Bieliavsky graduated from the Université libre de Bruxelles in 1991. He completed a doctorate in 1995 under the supervision of Michel Cahen at the Université libre de Bruxelles on Symmetric symplectic spaces.

He is currently professor of mathematics at the Université catholique de Louvain. His research subjects are theory of symmetric space, harmonic analysis, noncommutative geometry and mathematical physics.

Prizes 
 Prix Eugène-Catalan from the Royal Academy of Science, Letters and Fine Arts of Belgium (2015)

Publications  
 with Victor Gayral, Deformation Quantization for Actions of Kählerian Lie Groups, Volume 236, Number 1115, Memoirs of the American Mathematical Society (2014)
 Semisimple symplectic symmetric spaces, Geom. Dedicata 73 (1998), no. 3, 245–273.
 Symmetric spaces and star representations, Advances in Geometry, Progr. Math. 172, Birkhauser (Boston), 1999, 71–82.
 Strict quantization of solvable symmetric spaces, Journal of Symplectic Geometry 1 (2002), no. 2, 269–320. (math.QA/0010004.)
 with Y. Maeda, Convergent star product algebras on "$ax+b$", Lett. Math. Phys.  62 (2002), no. 3, 233–243.
 with M. Massar, Oscillatory integral formulae for left-invariant star products on a class of Lie groups, Lett. Math. Phys. 58 (2001), no. 2, 115–128.
 with M. Rooman, Ph. Spindel, Regular Poisson structures on massive non-rotating BTZ black holes, Nuclear Physics B 645 (2002), no. 1-2, 349–364.
 with M.Pevzner, Symmetric spaces and star representations III. The Poincarré disk, Noncommutative Harmonic Analysis, Progress in Mathematics, 220, Birkhäuser Boston, P. Delorme, M. Vergne eds (2004). (math.RT/0209206).

References

External links 
 Pierre Bieliavsky's page (in French)
 Universal deformation twists from evolution equations from Hausdorff Trimester Program Non-commutative Geometry and its Applications (15 December 2014)

1970 births
20th-century French mathematicians
21st-century French mathematicians
20th-century Belgian mathematicians
21st-century Belgian mathematicians
Algebraic geometers
Université libre de Bruxelles alumni
Academic staff of the Université catholique de Louvain
Living people
Scientists from Brussels